Clayton Charter Township, or more officially Charter Township of Clayton, is a charter township of Genesee County in the U.S. state of Michigan. The population was 7,581 at the 2010 census.

Communities 
The Village of Lennon is partially within the township on the western border.

History

In the Northeast area of the township on November 2, 1855, the Valeria post office opened with Andrew N. Felt as postmaster. This PO closed on November 21, 1860.

In 2002, the township residents approved a 1-mill tax renewal which was used to start its police department in December ending a contract with Genesee County Sheriff Department. The department started with two full-time and four part-time officers. From 2004 to 2008, the 10 officer department issued over $516 thousand in tickets making it one of the top three in Genesee County not considering the City of Flint.

On November 3, 2009, a successful recall took place removing the township supervisor, Bruce Beatty, and two trustees, Glenn Huffman and Chuck Shinouskis.

Additional public safety millage request were placed on the ballot due to falling property value thus revenue from the original millage. In May 2011, a 2.2-mill public safety tax request for police and fire, was turned down at the ballot. Individual police and fire millage were on the ballot at February 2012 election with the 1.6 mills for police defeated and the 0.8 mills fire approved. The township made another attempt at a police millage with a 1.9 mill proposal on the November 3, 2015 ballot.

Clayton began receiving Karegnondi Water Authority water treated by Genesee County Drain Commission Water and Waste Division on December 15, 2017.

 
1. Recalled.  2. Resigned.  3. Appointed.

Geography
The southeast corner is separated from the rest of the township by the city of Swartz Creek. Misteguay Creek has its headwaters in the township.

The Central Michigan Railway runs northeast toward Flushing and, ultimately, Saginaw, and southwest through Lennon toward Durand.

In the late 1980s, the township's land was mostly dedicated to farming. A few subdivisions existed on the north and east sides of the township, closer to urban areas, as well as one in the middle of the township. The Village of Lennon and  Swartz Creek Meadows, a mobile home park near the village, were the other built-up areas.

Since then, several large farms have been turned into subdivisions, and large houses have been constructed in more rural sections.

Government
Clayton has a Supervisor-Board style township government with elected supervisor, clerk, treasurer and four trustees. The township has its own police department.

The township and Swartz Creek City cooperate in operating the Swartz Creek Area Fire Department, which has one fire station in each of the two municipalities. The city's Perkins Library, which also serves Clayton and other Townships, is a branch of the Genesee District Library. Clayton is supply by Genesee County Drain Commission Water and Waste Division with treated Karegnondi Water Authority water. Clayton is supply by Karegnondi Water Authority water treated by Genesee County Drain Commission Water and Waste Division.

Clayton is part of or served by the following:
 Genesee County Commissioner District 8
 Michigan House of Representatives District 51
 State Senate District 32
 67th District Court Division 4
 Michigan's 5th Congressional District
 Genesee District Library

Demographics

At the 2010 census, there were 7,581 people, 2,897 households and 2,198 families residing in the township. The racial makeup of the township was 93.2% White, 3.2% African American, 0.5% Native American, 0.7% Asian, 0.1% from Native Hawaiian and Other Pacific Islander,  0.8% from other races, and 1.5% from two or more races. Hispanic or Latino of any race were 2.8% of the population.

There were 2,897 households, of which 20.6% had children under the age of 18 living with them, 63.7% were married couples living together, 8.7% had a female householder with no husband present, and 24.1% were non-families. 20.7% of all households were made up of individuals, and 9.5% had someone living alone who was 65 years of age or older. The average household size was 2.61 and the average family size was 3.01.

References

External links
 Clayton Charter Township
 Swartz Creek Area Fire Department

Populated places established in 1839
Townships in Genesee County, Michigan
Charter townships in Michigan
1839 establishments in Michigan